is a professional Japanese baseball player. He plays pitcher for the Orix Buffaloes.

External links

 NPB.com

1996 births
Living people
Baseball people from Tochigi Prefecture
Japanese baseball players
Nippon Professional Baseball pitchers
Orix Buffaloes players